Stylidium soboliferum, commonly known as Grampians triggerplant or bristly triggerplant, is a species of flowering plant in the genus Stylidium. It is endemic to the Grampians region in Victoria, Australia. Plants occur along drainage lines and in moist areas amongst rocks.

Stylidium soboliferum is listed as  "Rare in Victoria" on the Department of Sustainability and Environment's Advisory List of Rare Or Threatened Plants In Victoria.

See also 
List of Stylidium species

References 

Carnivorous plants of Australia
Flora of Victoria (Australia)
soboliferum
Asterales of Australia
Grampians (region)
Taxa named by Ferdinand von Mueller